The Kaprun disaster was a fire that occurred in an ascending train in the tunnel of the Gletscherbahn Kaprun 2 funicular in Kaprun, Austria, on 11 November 2000. The disaster killed 155 people (150 on the ascending train, two on the descending train and three in the mountain station). There were 12 survivors (10 Germans and two Austrians) from the burning ascending train. Most of the victims were skiers on their way to the Kitzsteinhorn Glacier.

Train
The Gletscherbahn Kaprun 2 was a funicular railway running from Kaprun to the Kitzsteinhorn, which opened in 1974. In 1993, it was modernized. There were two carriages running simultaneously on a single track, with a section allowing them to pass each other halfway. The tunnel terminated at the main reception centre, called the Alpincenter, where a motorized winch system pulled the wagons. There were no engines, fuel tanks, or drivers, only low-voltage electrical systems, 160-litre hydraulic tanks (used for the brake system) and an attendant who operated the hydraulic doors.
Each train had four passenger compartments and a cab at front and rear for the attendant, who switched back and forth as they travelled up and down. It could carry up to 180 passengers.

Disaster
On 11 November 2000, 161 passengers and one conductor boarded the funicular train for an early morning trip to the slopes. Prior to the passenger train leaving the lower terminus shortly after 9:00 am, the electric fan heater in the unattended cabin at the lower end of the train caught fire, due to a design fault that caused the unit to overheat. The fire melted through plastic pipes carrying flammable hydraulic fluid from the brake system, resulting in the loss of fluid pressure which caused the train to halt unexpectedly 600 metres into the tunnel (this was a standard safety feature). Several minutes later, the train conductor, who was in the cabin at the upper end of the train (which was the front, since the train was ascending), realized that a fire had broken out, reported it to the control centre, and attempted to open the hydraulically operated doors, but the system pressure loss prevented them from operating. The train conductor then lost contact with the control centre, because the fire had burned through a 16kV power cable running alongside the length of the track, causing a total blackout throughout the ski resort.

The passengers, by this stage aware of the fire and unable to exit through the doors, attempted to break the shatter-resistant acrylic windows in order to escape. Twelve people from the rear of the train, who successfully broke a window with a ski pole, followed the advice of another escapee who had been a volunteer fire fighter for 20 years, and escaped downwards past the fire and below the smoke.

Many of the still-trapped occupants had by now lost consciousness due to toxic fumes. Eventually, the conductor was able to unlock the doors, allowing them to be manually forced open by the remaining conscious passengers who spilled out into the tunnel and fled upwards and away from the fire. The tunnel acted like a giant blast furnace, sucking oxygen in from the bottom and rapidly sent the poisonous smoke, heat and the fire itself billowing upwards. All the passengers ascending on foot, as well as the train conductor, were asphyxiated by the smoke and then burned by the fire.

The conductor and the sole passenger on the railway's second train, which was descending the mountain in the same tunnel from above the burning carriage, also died of smoke inhalation. Two fleeing workers in the Alpine Centre, upon seeing the smoke, alerted employees and customers and escaped via an emergency exit. They left the exit doors open, a factor which increased the chimney effect within the tunnel, by allowing air to escape upwards more quickly and further intensifying the fire. Meanwhile, the centre filled with smoke and all except four people escaped from the centre. Firefighters reached the centre and saved one of the four, while the other three were asphyxiated.

Investigation
Nearly one year after the fire, the official inquiry determined that the cause was the failure, overheating and ignition of one of the fan heaters installed in the conductor's compartments that were not designed for use in a moving vehicle. The ignition was caused when a design fault caused the unit to overheat, which in turn caused the plastic mount for the heating element to break off, causing the element to jam against its plastic casing and catch fire. A slow leak of highly flammable hydraulic oil was ignited by the burning, melting heater, which in turn melted the plastic fluid lines, further feeding the flames and also resulting in the hydraulic pressure loss which caused the train to stop and the doors to fail.

The structural flaws of the funicular trains, especially the lack of safety mechanisms, were found to have played a role in the tragedy. Each funicular unit had its fire extinguishers out of the passengers' reach in the sealed attendants' compartments. No smoke detectors were installed. There was no cellphone reception within the tunnels, which meant that passengers had no method of contacting the attendant. Professor Joseph Nejez, a funicular train expert, said that the designers throughout the years had a perception that a fire could not occur since no fire had occurred in a funicular cabin prior to the Kaprun disaster. The train complied with area safety codes, which did not address the systems installed on the train during its 1993 upgrade. The onboard electric power, hydraulic braking systems, and fan heaters intended for use in homes instead of trains increased the likelihood of fire.

Casualties and aftermath

The funicular was never reopened after the disaster and was replaced by a gondola lift, a 24-person Gletscherjet 1 funitel. The stations were abandoned and the tunnel sealed. The track and tunnel remained in place for over a decade after the disaster, although never used by paying passengers. The track and supporting structure below the tunnel has now been completely removed, with just a gap in the trees to indicate where it stood.

On 19 February 2004, Judge Manfred Seiss acquitted all 16 suspects, including company officials, technicians, and government inspectors, clearing them of criminal negligence. Seiss said there was insufficient evidence to find the suspects responsible for the conditions that led to the blaze. In September 2007, the public prosecutor's office found that the manufacturer of the electric heater was not responsible.

One of the victims was Sandra Schmitt, a 19-year-old German freestyle skier who at the time was the reigning Women's Dual Moguls World Champion. Josef Schaupper, a seven-time Deaflympic medalist was also killed in the fatal accident along with his fellow deaf skiers.

References

External links

"Flashback: Kaprun ski train fire." BBC. Thursday, 19 February 2004.
"Alpine inferno suspects acquitted." CNN. Thursday, February 19, 2004.

Railway accidents and incidents in Austria
Fires in Austria
Railway accidents in 2000
2000 in Austria
Tunnel disasters
Train and rapid transit fires
Salzburg (state)
Chimney effect fires
Gletscherbahn Kaprun 2
Gletscherbahn Kaprun 2
Gletscherbahn Kaprun 2
November 2000 events in Europe
Transport disasters in Austria
2000 fires in Europe
2000 disasters in Austria